The Kreutzer Sonata is a 1937 German drama film directed by Veit Harlan and starring Lil Dagover, Peter Petersen and Albrecht Schoenhals. It was based on the 1889 novella of the same name by Leo Tolstoy.

The film's art direction was by Otto Hunte and Willy Schiller.

Cast
 Lil Dagover as Jelaina Posdnyschew
 Peter Petersen as Andrej Posdnyschew
 Albrecht Schoenhals as Gregor Tuchatschewsky
 Hilde Körber as Gruschenka
 Walter Werner as Dr. Raskin
 Wolfgang Kieling as Wassja
 Paul Bildt as Anwalt im Zugabteil
 Heinz Berghaus as Jungvermälter im Zugabteil
 Ilse Cotence as Dirne Lisawetha
 Margot Erbst as Landarbeiterin Marfa
 Hugo Flink as Gast bei Andrei
 Gabriele Hoffmann as Baronin auf Andrejs Fest
 Edith Linn as Fräulein im Zugabteil
 Paul Adalbert Ebelt as Gast auf Andrejs Fest
 Leo Peukert as Impresario Stansky
 Franz Pollandt as Troikakutscher
 Werner Siegert as Kartenspieler Maxim Wassilowitsch
 Armin Schweizer as Alter Mann im Zugabteil
 Lotte Spira as Fürstin auf Andrejs Fest
 Max Wilmsen as Ober im Wiesbadener Lokal
 Bruno Ziener as Diener Iwan
 Ellen Becker as 1. Verehrerin Gregors
 Friedl Hampter as Verehrerin Gregors
 Gertrud Hartwig as 3. Verehrerin Gregors
 Inge Stratner as Verehrerin Gregors
 Mussia Gürtler as Dienstmädchen Kitty
 Peter Busse as 1. Konzertbesucher in Wiesbaden
 Fritz Draeger as 2. Konzertbesucher in Wiesbaden
 Paul Ludwig Frey as 3. Konzertbesucher in Wiesbaden
 Werner Pledath as Hotelgast
 Ingeborg Carlsson as Blondine im Hotelspeisesaal
 Günther Lüders

References

Bibliography

External links 
 

1937 films
Films of Nazi Germany
German drama films
1937 drama films
1930s German-language films
Films directed by Veit Harlan
UFA GmbH films
Films based on The Kreutzer Sonata
German black-and-white films
1930s German films